Peter Gruber (born 7 September 1952) is a German former professional footballer who played as a defender.

Gruber spent four seasons in the Bundesliga with FC Bayern Munich.  In 1980, he moved to the United States and signed with the Dallas Tornado of the North American Soccer League. After two outdoor and one indoor season with the Tornado, he moved to the Tampa Bay Rowdies for one season before finishing his NASL career with the Chicago Sting. In March 1986, he was awarded $22,580 in workers' compensation for a 1983 knee injury he received during an indoor game with the Sting.

Honours
 Bundesliga champion: 1979–80

References

External links
 
 Peter Gruber NASL stats

1952 births
Living people
German footballers
West German footballers
Footballers from Munich
Association football defenders
Bundesliga players
North American Soccer League (1968–1984) indoor players
North American Soccer League (1968–1984) players
FC Bayern Munich footballers
Chicago Sting (NASL) players
Dallas Tornado players
Tampa Bay Rowdies (1975–1993) players
West German expatriate footballers
West German expatriate sportspeople in the United States
Expatriate soccer players in the United States